Typhlodaphne strebeli is a species of sea snail, a marine gastropod mollusk in the family Borsoniidae.

Description
The size of an adult shell varies between 15 mm and 30 mm. The elongate, ovate-fusiform shell has a buff color. It differs from Typhlodaphne purissima (Strebel, 1908) by being slender, having a smaller protoconch (1½ whorls) and showing flexuous, closely spaced, subobsolete axials (numbering 18 to 24) over the 5 whorls of the teleoconch. The shoulder is slightly concave. The narrowly ovate aperture has a rounded anterior end. Across the shell run numerous microscopic lirae.

Distribution
This marine species occurs along the Tierra del Fuego.

References

 Powell, A.W.B., 1951. Discovery Reports. Antarctic and Subantarctic Mollusca.
 Powell, Arthur William Baden. "Antarctic and subantarctic Mollusca." Records of the Auckland Institute and Museum 5.3/4 (1960): 117–193.
 Powell, A. W. B. "Mollusca of Antarctic and Subantarctic seas." Biogeography and ecology in Antarctica. Springer Netherlands, 1965. 333–380.
 Powell, A.W.B.. "In evaluating the molluscan faunas of Antarctic and Subantarctic seas many factors both past and present require to be considered." Biogeography and Ecology in Antarctica 15 (2013): 333.

External links
  Bouchet P., Kantor Yu.I., Sysoev A. & Puillandre N. (2011) A new operational classification of the Conoidea. Journal of Molluscan Studies 77: 273-308
 
 Linse, Katrin. "Mollusca of the Magellan region. A checklist of the species and their distribution." Scientia Marina 63.S1 (1999): 399-407

strebeli
Gastropods described in 1951